Orlando Falcons were an American women's soccer team based in Kissimmee, Florida, in the Greater Orlando area. The team was founded in 2004. The Falcons were a member of the Women's Premier Soccer League, the third tier of women's soccer in the United States and Canada. The team played in the Sunshine Conference.

The team played its home games at the Austin-Tindall Regional Park in Kissimmee, Florida. The club's colors were white, red and black in varying combinations.

Players

Current roster

Notable former players

Year-by-year

Honors

Competition history

Coaches

Stadia

Average attendance

External links
Orlando Falcons

Women's Premier Soccer League teams
Women's soccer clubs in the United States
Soccer clubs in Florida
Soccer clubs in Orlando, Florida
2005 establishments in Florida
2007 disestablishments in Florida
Sports in Kissimmee, Florida
Association football clubs established in 2005
Association football clubs disestablished in 2007
Women's sports in Florida